The 1936 New South Wales Rugby Football League premiership was the twenty-ninth season of Sydney’s top-level rugby league football club competition, Australia’s first. Nine teams from across the city contested the premiership during the season, which lasted from April until September, and culminated in Eastern Suburbs’ victory over Balmain in the final.

Season summary
In round 14 of the University club ended a losing streak which had begun round 2, 1934 and marked the most consecutive losses in NSWRL/NRL premiership history at 42. Eastern Suburbs went through 1936 undefeated – a feat achieved by teams in only five other seasons before or since.

The first premiership game of Rugby League at Henson Park was played on 1 April 1936, when Newtown defeated University 20–0.

For the first time since 1919 and only the second since the competition began South Sydney lost more games than it won.

Teams
 Balmain, formed on 23 January 1908 at Balmain Town Hall
 Canterbury-Bankstown
 Eastern Suburbs, formed on 24 January 1908 at Paddington Town Hall
 Newtown, formed on 14 January 1908
 North Sydney, formed on 7 February 1908
 South Sydney, formed on 17 January 1908 at Redfern Town Hall
 St. George, formed on 8 November 1920 at Kogarah School of Arts
 University, formed in 1919 at Sydney University
 Western Suburbs, formed on 4 February 1908

Ladder

Finals
In the two semi finals, the top two ranked teams Eastern Suburbs and Balmain beat their lower-ranked opponents North Sydney and Canterbury-Bankstown. Eastern Suburbs and Balmain then played off for the premiership in the Final.

Premiership Final

In front of a crowd of 14,395 at the Sydney Cricket Ground Easts were vying for back-to-back premierships and took on Balmain.

The match, officiated by referee Lal Deane was tight in the first half with a scoreline favouring Easts 8–6 at the break. In the second half Easts ran away with the game, scoring eight tries all up to Balmain's two.

The game marked the end of a sterling career for champion Tiger and former international halfback Joe “Chimpy” Busch, and was a suitable farewell for Roosters’ captain and star, Dave Brown. Brown headed to English club Warrington for two years, so that he did not play for the Tricolours during the 1937 and 1938 seasons.

Eastern Suburbs 32 (Tries: Fred Tottey 2, Rod O’Loan, Dave Brown, Ray Stehr, Ernie Norman, Jack Lynch, Andy Norval. Goals: Jack Lynch 2, Dave Brown 2 )

defeated

Balmain 12 (Tries: Frank Griffiths, Sid Goodwin. Goals: Sid Christensen 2, Bill Johnson)

References

External links
 Rugby League Tables - Notes AFL Tables
 Rugby League Tables - Season 1936 AFL Tables
 Premiership History and Statistics RL1908
 Results: 1931-40 at rabbitohs.com.au

New South Wales Rugby League premiership
Nswrfl season